Tbilisi-Tbilisi is a 2005 Georgian drama film directed by Levan Zakareishvili. It was selected as the Georgian entry for the Best Foreign Language Film at the 78th Academy Awards, but it was not nominated.

Cast
 Giorgi Maskharashvili
 Eka Nijaradze
 Rusiko Kobiashvili
 Kakha Kintsurashvili

See also
 List of submissions to the 78th Academy Awards for Best Foreign Language Film
 List of Georgian submissions for the Academy Award for Best International Feature Film

References

External links
 

2005 films
2005 drama films
Drama films from Georgia (country)
2000s Georgian-language films